The Orange County Labor Federation (OCLF) is a labor council of local unions operating in Orange County, California. It represents at least 90 local unions that have a combined membership of more than 200,000 members. The federation's stated purpose is to advance the interests of working people; it regularly endorses candidates in local elections.

References 

Trade unions in California
Organizations based in Orange County, California